The Kadu people (also spelt Kado) are an ethnic group in Myanmar. They speak the Kadu language.

References 

Ethnic groups in China
Ethnic groups in Myanmar
Ethnic groups in Yunnan
Sino-Tibetan-speaking people
Buddhist communities of Myanmar